Trigonopterus wangiwangiensis is a species of flightless weevil in the genus Trigonopterus from Indonesia.

Description 
The species is endemic to Sulawesi in Indonesia. The species was described in May 2019.

References 

wangiwangiensis
Beetles of Asia
Insects of Indonesia
Endemic fauna of Indonesia